A list of the films produced in Mexico in 1980 (see 1980 in film):

1980

External links

1980
Films
Lists of 1980 films by country or language